Rodgers Theatre Building is a historic commercial building located at Poplar Bluff, Butler County, Missouri.  It was built in 1949, and is a three-story, brick and concrete commercial building with Art Deco and Art Moderne stylistic elements. The building contains a drama stage and one commercial space and consists of three main sections; the facade and theatre marquee, the theatre, and the office block.  The theatre marquee features a prominent ziggurat tower. 

It was added to the National Register of Historic Places in 2001.

References

External links 

 Rodgers Theatre on Cinema Treasures

Theatres on the National Register of Historic Places in Missouri
Art Deco architecture in Missouri
Theatres completed in 1949
Buildings and structures in Butler County, Missouri
National Register of Historic Places in Butler County, Missouri